Roe Land District is a land district (cadastral division) of Western Australia, located within the South-West Land Division in the eastern Wheatbelt region of the state.

History
The district was created on 9 August 1899, named in honour of the first Surveyor General of Western Australia, John Septimus Roe, and was defined in the Government Gazette:

Towns
 Buniche (Shire of Lake Grace)
 Holt Rock (Shire of Kulin)
 Hyden (Shire of Kondinin)
 Karlgarin (Shire of Kondinin)
 Lake Biddy (Shire of Lake Grace)
 Lake Camm (Shire of Lake Grace)
 Lake King (Shire of Lake Grace)
 Mount Walker (Shire of Narembeen)
 Newdegate (Shire of Lake Grace)
 Pingaring (Shire of Kulin)
 Varley (Shire of Lake Grace)

References

Land districts of Western Australia
Wheatbelt (Western Australia)